Pieter Badenhorst is a paralympic athlete from South Africa, competing mainly in category T46 sprint events.

Badenhorst competed in three paralympics starting with the 1992 Summer Paralympics and continuing through the 1996 and 2000 games.  In the 1992 games, he competed in the triple jump and won a gold medal in the 400m. It took a world record from Poland's Jerzy Szelezak to deny him a second gold in the 200m. Badenhorst's other two appearances at games were not as successful, as he won no further medals despite competing in the 100m, 200m and long jump in 1996, and the 100m and 200m in 2000.

References

External links
 

Year of birth missing (living people)
Living people
South African male sprinters
South African male long jumpers
South African male triple jumpers
South African people of German descent
South African people of Dutch descent
Paralympic athletes of South Africa
Paralympic gold medalists for South Africa
Paralympic silver medalists for South Africa
Paralympic medalists in athletics (track and field)
Athletes (track and field) at the 1992 Summer Paralympics
Athletes (track and field) at the 1996 Summer Paralympics
Athletes (track and field) at the 2000 Summer Paralympics
Medalists at the 1992 Summer Paralympics
Sprinters with limb difference
Long jumpers with limb difference
Triple jumpers with limb difference
Paralympic sprinters
Paralympic long jumpers
Paralympic triple jumpers